Securities Appellate Tribunal is a statutory and autonomous body created as per provisions of section 15K of the Securities and Exchange Board of India (SEBI) Act, 1992. The presiding officer and other members of the Board are elected by the selection committee by the Prime Minister of India. Jurisdiction of Securities Appellate Tribunal extends to companies situated across India.

History and objective 

Securities Appellate Tribunal is formed as a statutory body as per the provisions of Section 15K of the Sebi Act, 1992 where orders passed by the Sebi are appelled, heard and resolved.

Powers 

Securities Appellate Tribunal hears appeals against the following orders:

  Orders issued by the Insurance Regulatory and Development Authority of India (IRDAI) in relation to cases filed before it.

  Orders issued by the  Pension Fund Regulatory and Development Authority (PFRDA) in relation to cases filed before it.

 Hear the orders passed by Securities and Exchange Board of India.

Jurisdiction 

The Jurisdiction of Securities Appellate Tribunal extends to whole of India.

The Securities Appellate Tribunal bench based in Delhi handles issues relating to corporates based in Punjab, Haryana ,Delhi and Kolkata .

Composition 

The composition of Securities Appellate Tribunal includes Presiding officer,Judicial members and technical members.

The appointment of Presiding officer and other members of Securities Appellate Tribunal is done by a committee headed by Prime Minister of India.

JP Devadhar is presiding member of Securities Appellate Tribunal.

Eligibility for members 

Following is the eligibility for the Presiding officer or members of Securities Appellate Tribunal.

 Should not have adjudged as insolvent.

 Should not have been convicted of an offence involving moral turpitude.

 Ineligibilty due to physical or mental incapacities.

 Possession of financial or any other interest prejudicially affecting the position as Presiding officer or member.

 Abuse of authority or position making his continuation in office prejudicial to public interest.

 In addition any specific issues mentioned in the Act.

Related articles 

 Securuties and Exchange Board of India.

References

External links 
 Official Website

Indian Tribunals
Securities and Exchange Board of India